Jordy van Workum (born 17 July 2000) is a Dutch long track speed skater. He is a member of the Jumbo-Visma team since 1 May 2020 and is coached by :nl:Sicco Janmaat.

Personal records

(updated 28 December 2022)

Tournament overview

 NC = No classification
 DQ = Disqualified
 DNQ = Did not qualify for the final distance

source:

References

Living people
2000 births
Dutch male speed skaters